The following is a list of programs broadcast on MeTV, a classic television network carried on digital subchannels of over-the-air broadcast stations, live streaming, satellite TV, and cable TV in the United States.  This list does not include runs on MeTV's local stations in Chicago and Milwaukee before December 2010.

Current programming

Original series
Collector's Call (2019–present) (Returns 2023)
Svengoolie (2011–present)
Sventoonie (2022–present; on hiatus as of March 4, 2023)
Toon In with Me (2021–present)

Acquired series

Sitcoms

 All in the Family
The Andy Griffith Show (shared with TV Land and Sundance TV)
The Brady Bunch
The Beverly Hillbillies
The Dick Van Dyke Show
The Flintstones
Gilligan's Island
Green Acres
Hogan's Heroes
The Honeymooners
The Jetsons
Leave It to Beaver
The Love Boat
M*A*S*H
Mama's Family
My Three Sons
Petticoat Junction
The Three Stooges

Drama

The A-Team
Adam-12
Barnaby Jones
Cannon
Dragnet
The Fugitive
Highway Patrol
In the Heat of the Night
Mannix
Matlock
Mission: Impossible
Perry Mason
Peter Gunn (also available online)
The Waltons

Science fiction
 
The Invaders
Kolchak: The Night Stalker
Land of the Giants
Lost in Space
Star Trek
Thunderbirds
The Time Tunnel
Voyage to the Bottom of the Sea

Westerns

The Big Valley
Bonanza
Gunsmoke
Have Gun – Will Travel
Rawhide
The Rifleman (also available online)
Wagon Train
Wanted: Dead or Alive (also available online)
The Wild Wild West

Anthology
Alfred Hitchcock Presents
The Twilight Zone

Variety
The Carol Burnett Show
Ed Sullivan's Rock 'n' Roll Classics

Animated
Bugs Bunny & Friends (including Looney Tunes and Merrie Melodies cartoons)
Popeye and Pink Panther’s Party (including Betty Boop, The Inspector, and Roland and Ratfink)
The Tom and Jerry Show (including other MGM Cartoons such as Droopy, Barney Bear, and Screwball Squirrel)

E/I
Saved by the Bell

Former programming

Science fiction
Adventures of SupermanWonder Woman

Sitcoms
ALF
 Cheers
Full House
Gomer Pyle USMC
Happy Days
 I Love Lucy
The Monkees
 The Patty Duke Show
That Girl

Drama
Columbo
MacGyver

E/I / Children's programming
Beakman's World
Bill Nye the Science Guy
Edgemont
Green Screen Adventures
Gumby
H.R. Pufnstuf
He-Man and the Masters of the Universe
Land of the Lost
Mr. Magoo
Mystery Hunters
She-Ra: Princess of Power

Current programming available online

The Abbott and Costello Show
The Donna Reed Show
The Invisible Man
The Lucy Show
Mr. Lucky

References

External links
 
 

MeTV